Quijote Arena is an arena in Ciudad Real, Spain.  It is primarily used for team handball and was the home arena of BM Ciudad Real.  The arena holds 6,863 people and was opened in 2004.

It is located on the Avenida de Puertollano, and is owned by the municipality of Ciudad Real.

In September 2014, BM Alarcos Ciudad Real confirmed they would start to play their home games at Quijote Arena.

References

External links 
Arena information

Handball venues in Spain
Indoor arenas in Spain
Sports venues in Castilla–La Mancha
Sport in Ciudad Real
Buildings and structures in Ciudad Real